Hopewell is a settlement in Saint Thomas Parish, Barbados.

References

Populated places in Barbados